John Emmeus Davis (born 1949) is an American scholar and community organizer who has advanced the worldwide understanding and development of community land trusts. His professional practice has focused on assisting new community land trusts (CLTs),  supporting the growth of older CLTs, and helping municipal agencies, Habitat for Humanity affiliates, and other nonprofit organizations to add permanently affordable housing to their program mix. In 2014, he and a colleague, Greg Rosenberg, established an online archive of historical materials named Roots & Branches: A Gardener’s Guide to the Origins and Evolution of the Community Land Trust.

Since 2017, he has served as co-director of the Center for Community Land Trust Innovation.

Education
Davis earned a B.A. in Philosophy from Vanderbilt University in 1971, and an M.S. in Developmental Sociology from Cornell University in 1981.  He earned a Ph.D. in Community Development Planning and Community and Regional Sociology from Cornell University in 1986.

Career
Davis began his career as a community organizer and social services administrator in the coalfields of East Tennessee. While still an undergraduate at Vanderbilt University, he joined the SHC, which support the work of healthcare providers who provided free medical screenings for low-income families in Appalachia. Two outgrowths of SHC's work were the establishment of a string of community-controlled clinics in East Tennessee and Eastern Kentucky and the creation of Save Our Cumberland Mountains, a grassroots organization fighting for environmental justice.

Remaining in East Tennessee after college, Davis was employed for several years by a federally funded child development program, which operated a dozen day care centers throughout Anderson County. He became the executive director of this program in 1974, leaving in 1976 when he enrolled at Cornell University's graduate school, for Development Sociology.

After graduate school he joined the staff of the Institute for Community Economics (1981-1985), co-authored the Community Land Trust Handbook (Rodale Press, 1982), and assisted with the early development of community land trusts in the United States. For his contributions to advancing the cause of CLTs, he received the Swann-Matthei Award from the National CLT Network in 2006. He worked as the housing director and Enterprise Community coordinator for the City of Burlington, Vermont from 1986 to 1996, under mayors Bernie Sanders and Mayor Peter Clavelle.

Davis was a co-founder of Burlington Associates in Community Development, LLC In 1993, a national consulting cooperative that has provided assistance to a dozen cities and over 100 community land trusts in the United States and other countries. Davis has also worked closely with Habitat for Humanity, helping a number of affiliates to adopt forms of housing that remain permanently affordable. Habitat for Humanity International commissioned him to prepare its 2017 Shelter Report, a publication entitled Affordable for Good: Building Inclusive Communities through Homes that Last.

Davis was a visiting fellow at the Lincoln Institute of Land Policy from 2007 to 2009 and has been a Senior Fellow at the National Housing Institute since 2010.  He joined Greg Rosenberg in founding the Center for Community Land Trust Innovation in 2017 and in establishing the center's publishing division, Terra Nostra Press, in 2019.

Academics
Davis has taught at Tufts University, the University of Vermont, Southern New Hampshire University and the Massachusetts Institute of Technology. He was a founding member of the faculty and board of the National Community Land Trust Academy (2006-2012), a program of the National Community Land Trust Network renamed Grounded Solutions Network after merging with the Cornerstone Partnership in 2016).  He served for five years as the Academy's dean.

In September 2012, the National CLT Network established the John Emmeus Davis Award for Scholarship.  This awards recognizes individuals who have "contributed significant scholarship to advance the field of community land trusts, or who have been inspirational teachers, coaches or mentors."

Major works
Manuel d’antispeculation immobilière  (Montreal, Quebec: Les Éditions Écosociété, 2014).
“Between Devolution and the Deep Blue Sea: What’s a City or State To Do?” In A Right to Housing: Foundation of a New Social Agenda. Editors: Rachel Bratt, Chester Hartman & Michael Stone (Temple University Press, 2006).
The Affordable City: Toward a Third Sector Housing Policy (Temple University Press, 1994).
The Community Land Trust Handbook, with multiple authors, The Institute for Community Economics (Rodale Press, 1982).

References

1949 births
Vanderbilt University alumni
Cornell University alumni
Living people
Tufts University faculty
University of Vermont faculty
Massachusetts Institute of Technology faculty
Southern New Hampshire University faculty